iPod Socks were a set of multi-colored cotton knit socks introduced by Apple Computer in November 2004 for protection of iPods from damage during travel.

History
The socks were jokingly presented by Apple CEO Steve Jobs as a "revolutionary new product" at a special music event held on October 26, 2004. They were available in a package of six different colors, including green, purple, grey, blue, orange and pink, for 29.

Apple stopped selling the product sometime in September 2012. The set soon became a collector's item, with aftermarket prices rising as high as 90 by 2014.

Reception 
Jeremy Horwitz of iLounge gave a rating of B− for the socks, indicating a "Limited Recommendation". Horwitz noted the product's two-toned design and ability to hold an iPod of any size, but criticized the socks for inhibiting access to the screen and controls and high price. In 2021, Chaim Gartenberg of The Verge described the product as a "bizarre piece of Apple's history" comparable to the Polishing Cloth, noting that the socks remained relatively popular during its availability from 2004 to 2012 due to their "relatively universal size" and bright colors.

References

External links
Apple iPod Socks at Apple (archived 2007-10-21, 2004-11-12)

Discontinued Apple Inc. products
iPod accessories
Products introduced in 2004
Socks
Products and services discontinued in 2012